Beijing Lu Station is a station of Guangzhou Metro Line 6. It is located underground in Yuexiu District near the Beijing Road Pedestrian Street. It started operation on 28 December 2013.

Station layout

Exits

References

Railway stations in China opened in 2013
Guangzhou Metro stations in Yuexiu District